Veralynn may refer to:

4214 Veralynn, a main-belt asteroid
Vera Lynn (1917–2020), English singer whose career flourished during World War II
Vera-Lynn, a minor Emmerdale character